"I'll Be Home" is a 1955 song that was written by Ferdinand Washington and songwriter, Stan Lewis.

Flamingos version
The Flamingos first recorded the song in October, 1955 at Chess' rudimentary office studio at 4750 South Cottage Grove using just two microphones and a tape recorder, then later at Universal Recording Corporation. Leonard Chess chose to release the less-polished version, recorded at Chess. The song was released on Chess' Checker Records subsidiary in January, 1956, with The Flamingos version going to No. 5 on Billboard's R&B chart, its sales greatly overshadowed by the Pat Boone version released the same month.

Pat Boone version

Pat Boone recorded the song in December, 1955 with producer Randy Wood for Dot Records. Boone's version was released as a single with "Tutti Frutti" as the B-side in January, 1956. Boone's version peaked at No. 5 on the US Billboard chart. Overseas, it was a number one hit in the UK Singles Chart, spending five weeks at No. 1, and 24 weeks on the charts altogether. It was the best-selling single of 1956 in the United Kingdom.

Other versions
Slim Whitman featured a version on his hit 1977 album Home on the Range.

References

1956 singles
1955 singles
Checker Records singles
UK Singles Chart number-one singles
Pat Boone songs
Songs written by Ferdinand Washington
1955 songs